Yellow Arrow is a public art project that was active from 2004-2006.

Yellow Arrow may also refer to:

 "The Yellow Arrow", a 1993 short story by Victor Pelevin
 "La Flecha Amarilla" (the Yellow Arrow), a nickname of Spanish cyclist Miguel Poblet

See also
 Arrow (disambiguation)
 Black Arrow (disambiguation)
 Blue Arrow (disambiguation)
 Golden Arrow (disambiguation)
 Green Arrow (disambiguation)
 Pink Arrow (disambiguation)
 Red Arrow (disambiguation)
 Silver Arrow (disambiguation)
 White Arrow (disambiguation)